Alfred Streun (June 17, 1925 – November 26, 2019) was a Swiss professional ice hockey player who competed for the Swiss national team at the 1952 Winter Olympics.

References

1925 births
2019 deaths
Ice hockey players at the 1952 Winter Olympics
Olympic ice hockey players of Switzerland
Ice hockey people from Bern